Minapur Assembly constituency is an assembly constituency in Muzaffarpur district in the Indian state of Bihar.

Overview
As per Delimitation of Parliamentary and Assembly constituencies Order, 2008, No. 90 Minapur Assembly constituency is composed of the following: Minapur community development block; Garha, Jhaphan, Kafen Chaudhary, Narkatiya, Narma, Patiyasa and Rampur Jaipal gram panchayats of Bochahan CD Block.

Minapur Assembly constituency is part of No. 16 Vaishali (Lok Sabha constituency).

Members of Legislative Assembly

Election results

2020

References

External links
 

Assembly constituencies of Bihar
Politics of Muzaffarpur district